Kikai Sentai Zenkaiger is a Japanese tokusatsu drama celebrating the 45th anniversary of Toei's long-running Super Sentai series produced by TV Asahi and the second series in the franchise filmed in the Reiwa period. The series follows the titular Zenkaigers, a team composed of one human and four Kikainoids, mechanical life forms from the parallel world of Kikaitopia who fight the evil dynasty of Tozitend by harnessing the powers of their Super Sentai predecessors.

Episodes

References

Zenkaiger
Kikai Sentai Zenkaiger